American Odyssey (known in the UK under its original title Odyssey) is an American action thriller television series which aired on NBC from April 5 to June 28, 2015. Created by Peter Horton, Adam Armus and Kay Foster, the series revolves around the discovery by a U.S. Army team on a secret mission in Mali, that a major U.S. company has been funding Islamist terror groups, and the subsequent cover-up of this revelation, which involves the attack and killing of the team of U.S. soldiers by private military contractors dispatched by the same company.

The series stars Anna Friel, Peter Facinelli, Jake Robinson, Jim True-Frost, Treat Williams, Nate Mooney, Elena Kampouris, Daniella Pineda, Sadie Sink, Adewale Akinnuoye-Agbaje and Omar Ghazaoui. It is envisioned by the creators as a modern-day take on Homer's Odyssey.

On June 30, 2015, NBC cancelled the series after one season.

Cast

Main cast
 Anna Friel as Sergeant Odelle Ballard, a member of the U.S. Army stationed in Mali working with Task Force 24 (a unit of the Joint Special Operations Command)
 Peter Facinelli as Peter Decker, Former U.S. Attorney now working for Simon-Wachtel in business intelligence 
 Jake Robinson as Harrison Walters, a political activist who becomes involved after he meets a hacker who claims to have unearthed a massive coverup involving the military.
 Jim True-Frost as Ron Ballard, husband of Odelle Ballard
 Treat Williams as Colonel Stephen Glen, a high-ranking officer of the United States Africa Command
 Nate Mooney as Bob Offer, an activist and hacker
 Elena Kampouris as Maya Decker, daughter of Peter Decker
 Daniella Pineda as Ruby Simms which is an alias, born as Erica "Rikki" Castillo, a hitwoman/assassin for Societel, also known as SOC. Introduces herself as a "freelance reporter". She later falls in love with Harrison Walters. 
 Sadie Sink as Suzanne Ballard, daughter of Odelle and Ron Ballard
 Adewale Akinnuoye-Agbaje as Frank Majors, OSELA mercenary
 Omar Ghazaoui as Aslam, young Malian who helps Sgt. Ballard in her journey back home.
 Jayne Houdyshell as Rose Offer

Recurring cast
 Sarah Wynter as Sarah Decker, wife of Peter and mother of Maya
 Jay O. Sanders as Alex Baker, CEO of Societel
 Grégory Fitoussi as Luc Girard, French expatriate drug dealer in Mali
 Sherman Augustus as Frank McDonald, Peter's boss at Simon-Wachtel
 Yousef Sweid as Shakir Khan, Aslam's uncle and famous television drag queen personality
 Connor Trinneer as Michael Banks, CEO of Osela Private Security, and Ruby Simms' superior
 Allison Mack as Julia, a military intelligence analyst who befriends Suzanne
 Alex Kingston as Jennifer Wachtel, head of Simon-Wachtel
 Orla Brady as Sophia Tsaldari, leading candidate for Greek Prime Minister
 Rajeev Pahuja as Yusif, Imam in Pakistan, living underground in the United States
 Tala Ashe as Anna Stone
Bianca de la Garza as Tania, Anchor
 Sara Martins as Serena, Luc Girard's girlfriend
 Cameron Dallas as Cameron, Maya's temporary boyfriend
 Stephen Caffrey as David Tennant, an executive who is part of the conspiracy
 Reed Birney as Senator Thomas Darnell, a politician who is part of the conspiracy

Production and release
NBC commissioned the series in May 2014 under the title Odyssey, but only three weeks before the premiere, the network decided to change the title to American Odyssey, stating that this "better reflects the journey undertaken by lead character Odelle". However, many commentators regarded as an attempt by NBC to piggyback on the box office success of American Sniper and ABC's success with American Crime. According to TV Insider, the main reason for the surprising last minute name change was that the awareness of the upcoming series was low, and that the retitling would offer "the opportunity to better market the show to middle-American audiences."

A teaser trailer was released on March 6, 2015, which revealed an April 5 release date and featured the tagline, "A soldier. A mother. Betrayed. Her odyssey begins."

The first two episodes were shown as a double bill when BBC Two premiered the series in the United Kingdom on Sunday June 28, 2015, under its original name.

The series was originally set to premiere in Australia on the Seven Network in 2015 but did not premiere until March 20, 2016 in a late night timeslot.

Reception
The series has received mixed or average reviews from U.S. critics. On Rotten Tomatoes, it has a rating of 54% based on 28 reviews, with an average rating of 6.7/10. The site's critical consensus reads "With a been-there-seen-that premise and multiple muddled plots, American Odyssey can't escape the shadows of its superior predecessors in an age of solid spy/action television." On Metacritic, the show has a score of 59 out of 100, based on 17 critics, indicating "Mixed or average reviews".

The initial reaction from British reviewers was also fairly negative. Michael Hogan in The Daily Telegraph wrote after the first two episodes had aired that "The programme wasn't without tense moments but the trouble was its scattergun plotting. It was like someone had cut up broadsheet newspapers from recent years and glued bits randomly to the script, making the whole thing lack cohesion. Homeland it certainly isn't." Ellen E. Jones of The Independent was less harsh, writing that "This new series starring Anna Friel as an American special-ops soldier really is global conflict for dummies, but that doesn't necessarily make for bad television. It's nonsense, but it's glossy, well-executed nonsense." David Butcher in Radio Times commented that "Parts of Odyssey may remind you dimly of Homeland. Its American network NBC probably hoped to create a down-and-dirty version of the Claire Danes thriller, but what we end up with is more Poundland than Homeland. It's perfectly serviceable, undemanding drama, with a bit of (not nearly enough) action here and there. But Homeland it ain’t."

Episodes

References

External links
 
 
 

2015 American television series debuts
2015 American television series endings
2010s American drama television series
American action television series
American military television series
2010s American political television series
American thriller television series
English-language television shows
NBC original programming
Television series by Universal Television
Television shows set in Mali
Terrorism in television
American political drama television series